Eadgifu of Kent (also Edgiva or Ediva; in or before 903 – in or after 966) was the third wife of Edward the Elder, King of Wessex.

Biography
Eadgifu was the daughter of Sigehelm, Ealdorman of Kent, who died at the Battle of the Holme in 902.  She married Edward in about 919 and became the mother of two sons, Edmund I of England, later King Edmund I, and Eadred of England, later King Eadred, and two daughters, Saint Eadburh of Winchester and Eadgifu. She survived Edward by many years, dying in the reign of her grandson Edgar.

According to a narrative written in the early 960s, her father had given Cooling in Kent to a man called Goda as security for a loan. She claimed that her father had repaid the loan and left the land to her, but Goda denied receiving payment and refused to surrender the land. She got possession of Cooling six years after her father's death, when her friends persuaded King Edward to threaten to dispossess Goda of his property unless he gave up the estate. Edward later declared Goda's lands forfeit and gave the charters to Eadgifu, but she returned most of the estates to Goda, although retained the charters. Some time after this her marriage to Edward took place. After his death King Æthelstan required Eadgifu to return the charters to Goda, perhaps because the king was on bad terms with his stepmother.

She disappeared from court during the reign of her step-son, King Æthelstan, but she was prominent and influential during the reign of her two sons and attested many of their charters. In charter S 562 in 953, a grant to her by Eadred of land at Felpham in Sussex, she is described as famula Dei, suggesting that she may have taken religious vows while continuing to live on her own estates.

Following the death of her younger son Eadred in 955, she was deprived of her lands by her eldest grandson, King Eadwig, perhaps because she took the side of his younger brother, Edgar, in the struggle between them. When Edgar succeeded on Eadwig's death in 959 she recovered some lands and received generous gifts from her grandson, but she never returned to her prominent position at court. She is last recorded as a witness to a charter in 966.

She was known as a supporter of saintly churchmen and a benefactor of churches.

See also
House of Wessex family tree

Notes

References

External links
 

10th-century English women
10th-century English people
Wives of Edward the Elder
10th-century deaths
Year of birth unknown
Queen mothers